The Amazon molly (Poecilia formosa) is a freshwater fish native to warm, fresh waters between Tuxpan River in northeastern Mexico and  the Rio Grande and the Nueces River in the southern parts of the U.S. state of Texas. It reproduces through gynogenesis, and essentially all individuals are females. The common name acknowledges this trait as a reference to the Amazon warriors, a female-run society in Greek mythology.

Reproduction
Reproduction is through gynogenesis, which is sperm-dependent parthenogenesis. This means that females must mate with a male of a closely related species, but the sperm only triggers reproduction and is not incorporated into the already diploid egg cells the mother is carrying (except in extraordinary circumstances). This results in clones of the mother being produced en masse. This characteristic has led to the Amazon molly becoming an all-female species. Other all-female species include the New Mexico whiptail, desert grassland whiptail lizard, and  blue-spotted salamander. 

In nature, the Amazon molly typically mates with a male from one of four different species, either P. latipinna, P. mexicana, P. latipunctata, or occasionally P. sphenops. One other male that could possibly exist in the Amazon molly's natural range that could induce parthenogenesis in Amazon molly females is the triploid Amazon molly males. These triploid males are very rare in nature and are not necessary in the reproduction of the species, which is why the species is considered to be all female. 

Since the male's sperm is not contributing to the genetic makeup of the offspring, it may seem non-beneficial for males of closely related species to participate in mating with the Amazon molly, though research shows that females of other species, such as the Atlantic molly, are trend conscious and are more likely to mate with a male of their species if they see that male mate with an Amazon molly. Therefore, the Amazon molly can only live in habitats that are also occupied by a species of male that will reproduce with them.

The Amazon molly reaches sexual maturity one to six months after birth, and typically has a brood between 60 and 100 fry (young) being delivered every 30–40 days. This lends itself to a large potential for population growth as long as host males are present. The wide variability in maturity dates and brood sizes is a result of genetic heritage, varying temperatures, and food availability. They become sexually mature faster and produce larger broods in warm (approximately ) water that provides an overabundance of food.

The Amazon molly has been reproducing asexually for about 100,000-200,000 years. This is about 500,000 generations of Amazon molly. Asexual lineages typically go extinct after 10,000-100,000 generations. There is research being done to determine how the Amazon molly has not gone extinct or developed a Muller's ratchet of mutations. Researchers believe the answer is in the genome of the Amazon molly, yet more research must be done to determine this.

P. formosa is a hybrid species and P. mexicana is one of the parental species.   Its other progenitor is most likely an extant, as yet undescribed, subspecies of P. latipinna or an extinct ancestor of P. latipinna.

References

No sex for all-girl fish species BBC News, 23 April 2008
 Heubel, Katja U.: Population ecology and sexual preferences in the mating complex of the unisexual Amazon molly Poecilia formosa (Girard, 1859).Hamburg, University, Diss., 2004. 

Poecilia
Freshwater fish of Mexico
Freshwater fish of the United States
Fish hybrids
Live-bearing fish
Ovoviviparous fish
Vertebrate parthenogenesis
Fish described in 1859
Taxa named by Charles Frédéric Girard